Plicaria endocarpoides is a species of apothecial fungus belonging to the family Pezizaceae. This is a common European fungus of burnt ground, appearing from spring to autumn as dark brownish-coloured cups up to 6 cm in diameter, usually in groups. The caps usually flatten with age.

Plicaria trachycarpa is similar.

References

Further reading

Plicaria endocarpoides at Species Fungorum

Pezizaceae
Fungi described in 1855
Taxa named by Miles Joseph Berkeley